Renner Lutheran Church, also known as Nidaros Norwegian Evangelical Lutheran Church, is a historic church located in Renner, South Dakota. The church is listed on the National Register of Historic Places as Renner Lutheran Sanctuary. It is reportedly the oldest church in operation in South Dakota.

History

The church was founded as Nidaros Church in 1868. First located in the sod home Norwegian immigrants John and Kirsti Thompson, a church was later built on the prairie roughly 3 miles south of Baltic, South Dakota. That church was later destroyed in a wind storm, and rebuilt in 1878. The original church's 100 foot steeple was believed to be the cause of its destruction, so a shorter steeple was selected during reconstruction. Additional churches were also constructed in the region to accommodate churchgoers, since frequent flooding along the Big Sioux River made travel difficult.

The church was moved to Baltic around 1911 or 1912, since the town had no church of its own at the time. It was moved a second time in 1939 to Renner, South Dakota, where it stands today. The church has been in continuous operation for more than 125 years, and is considered the oldest operational church in the state of South Dakota. It is part of the Evangelical Lutheran Church in America denomination. The church's altar was constructed in 1886, and remains a central fixture in the sanctuary.

The church was renamed Renner Lutheran Church in 2009, to avoid confusion with the East and West Nidaros churches that were also part of the congregation.

See also
List of the oldest churches in the United States
List of the oldest buildings in South Dakota

External links
Renner Lutheran Church website

References

Lutheran churches in South Dakota
Churches on the National Register of Historic Places in South Dakota
Churches completed in 1878
19th-century Lutheran churches in the United States
Churches in Minnehaha County, South Dakota
Norwegian-American culture in South Dakota
National Register of Historic Places in Minnehaha County, South Dakota